The historic 1933 South Carolina Gamecocks football team represented the University of South Carolina as a member of the Southern Conference (SoCon) during the 1933 college football season. Led by sixth-year head coach Billy Laval, the Gamecocks compiled an overall record of 6–3–1 with a mark of 3–0 in conference play, placing in the SoCon. Duke, with a 4–0 conference record was declared the SoCon champion. Earl Clary and Buddy Morehead were the team captains. This was the last season in which South Carolina played their home games at Melton Field.

Schedule

Game summaries

Wofford

On September 23, 1933, South Carolina faced Wofford. Earl Clary rushed for 109 yards in 15 attempts Hal Mauney gained 106 yards in 15 attempts, Wilburn Clary 90 yards in 14. For Wofford, Bouknight gained 34 yards on 9 tries. The Gamecocks piled up a total of 459, 367 rushing yards, and 92 passing yards. Wofford had 111 yards: 51 running, 60 passing. Approximately 3,000 saw the game at Melton Field.

Temple

On September 29, 1933, South Carolina faced Pop Warner's Temple Owls. It was Warner's Temple debut as coach and attracted 25,000 fans at Temple Stadium. In the first quarter E. Zukas returned a kick for 80 yards for temple giving them a 6-0 lead. Temple's fullback Stonick recorded the other two touchdowns. Harold Mauney for South Carolina completed a 56-yard pass to Craig, then ran it in for South Carolina's only score of the game. Late in the 4th quarter Temple's center Shapiro intercepted a Carolina pass on the latter side of the 16 yard line running it in for six. Stevens made the extra point which put Temple up 26-6.

Villanova

On October 7, 1933, South Carolina faced Villanova in front of 6,000 spectators at the State Faigrounds. Villanova was led by dashing "Whitey" Randour one of the best halfbacks in the east. Randour carried it 18 times for 96 yards and 2 scores. The "Gaffney Ghost" did most of the carrying for the Gamecocks, he carried it 20 times for 54 yards.

Clemson

In the annual State fair classic, Harold Mauney for South Carolina was the hero, recording 147 yards on 30 carries, he completed 3 passes for 39 yards. Wilburn Clary recorded 113 yards on 32 carries. Clemson only recorded four first downs the entire game, while the Gamecocks recorded 21 first downs. In the only score of the entire game Mauney passed to Fred Hambright for 25 yards in the first quarter. This was the third straight victory for South Carolina over rivals Clemson.

Citadel

On October 26, 1933 at the Orangeburg Fairgrounds, South Carolina faced Citadel. On the seventh play of the game The "Gaffney ghost" Earl Clary sprinted 34 yards through the Citadal eleven for a Touchdown. Clary also scored late in the 4th period, despite accounting for all of the Gamecock scoring, Clary hardly played over 10 minutes. Clary rushed for 56 yards on 12 carries. For Citadel, Arthur Ferguson a hard-running halfback from Macon, GA scored Citadel's only touchdown late in the fourth period.

VPI

On October 28, South Carolina blanked the VPI Gobblers, 12–0, at Miles Stadium in Blacksburg, Virginia. Earl Clary scored both touchdowns for the Gamecocks.

LSU

South Carolina met LSU at Tiger Stadium on November the 4th, 1933 in front of about 8,000. South Carolina's only score came in the second quarter on a run by Earl Clary.

NC State

In the last game in the history of Melton field, Earl "The Gaffney Ghost" Clary starred as South Carolina defeated bitter rival NC State on November 11, 1933 and claimed the Southern Conference Championship with a perfect 3-0 record. Clary scored both touchdowns on long brilliant runs, and finished with 113 yards on 19 carries. At halftime Columbia celebrated the 15th year since the end of World War 1.

Furman

On November 19, 1933, South Carolina and Furman both failed to score any points in a draw. Earl Clary rushed for 80 yards on 28 carries, Scott for Furman rushed for 55 yards on 9 carries. Furman out-gained Carolina 130 yards to 119, and also had 1 more first down than the Gamecocks. Around 2,000 high school players from around the state of South Carolina were in attendance for the game at the State Fairgrounds, they received free tickets.

Auburn

South Carolina legend Earl "The Ghost of Gaffney" Clary brought his legendary career to an end scoring both Gamecock touchdowns as South Carolina defeated Auburn at Legion field on December 2, 1933. South Carolina led by Earl Clary, and Harold Mauney rushed for 176 yards. Clary was called the "Gaffney Ghost" because of his great high school career at Gaffney high, and he was like a ghost trying to tackle him. He made all of South Carolina's touchdowns since the Clemson game, and led the South Carolina team to their only SoCon championship.

References

South Carolina
South Carolina Gamecocks football seasons
South Carolina Gamecocks football